Kanō Muneshige (狩野 宗茂) was a Japanese samurai of the Kamakura period. He was the son of Kudō Shigemitsu, the founder of the Kanō clan.

Life 
Born as a son of Kudō Shigemitsu, the fourth son of Kudō Suketaka (Itō Ietsugu), the sixth head of Fujiwara Nanke's Kudō clan.

Muneshige began serving Minamoto no Yoritomo, and in the Genpei War, he fought on Yoritomo's side from the beginning. In May 1193, he participated in Yoritomo's grand hunting event, Fuji no Makigari. After the brothers Soga Sukenari and Tokimune killed their father's killer, Kudō Suketsune, during the Revenge of the Soga Brothers incident on the last night of the hunting event, Muneshige was present at Tokimune's interrogation.

Ever since Muneshige, his descendants were called "Kanō-suke" (suke being one of the titles for kokushi officials) for generations. They served as kokushi officials in the Izu Province. The name "Kanō" comes from the Kanō Manor in Izu Province (currently near Kanō River in Odairakakigi, Izu, Shizuoka Prefecture), where the Kudō clan was based.

Genealogy 
Kanō Masanobu, the founder of the Kanō school and the Kanō family, a family of distinguished Japanese painters, is said to be a descendant of Kanō Muneshige.

References 

Samurai
People of Kamakura-period Japan